Thukha Yadana Company (also spelt Thukhar Yadanar) is a construction company based in Myanmar. It was one of four Burmese firms involved in the Dagon City 1 project, a major planned development in Dagon Township, Yangon, near the Shwedagon Pagoda. The project was shut down by the national government on 7 July 2015 over growing public opposition to the project. The project had been temporarily suspended in February 2015 by the Yangon City Development Committee.

References

Service companies of Myanmar
Construction and civil engineering companies established in 1985
1985 establishments in Burma